Methyltransferase like 24 is a protein that in humans is encoded by the METTL24 gene.

References

Further reading